Nocticola is a genus of cockroaches in the family Nocticolidae distributed in Africa, south-east Asia and Australia. Nocticola are different from every other cockroach in that they are not infected with Blattabacterium cuenoti. This makes them the only genus in Blattodea that do not have the bacteria.

Species
There are currently 25 known species:

 Nocticola adebratti
 Nocticola australiensis
 Nocticola babindaensis
 Nocticola bolivari
 Nocticola brooksi
 Nocticola caeca
 Nocticola clavata
 Nocticola cockingi
 Nocticola currani
 Nocticola decaryi
 Nocticola flabella
 Nocticola gerlachi: Gerlach's cockroach (endangered)
 Nocticola gonzalezi
 Nocticola jodarlingtonae
 Nocticola leleupi
 Nocticola pheromosa
 Nocticola quartermainei
 Nocticola remyi
 Nocticola rohini
 Nocticola scytala
 Nocticola simoni
 Nocticola sinensis
 Nocticola termitophila
 Nocticola uenoi
 Nocticola wliensis

References

Cockroaches
Cockroach genera